Konrad Klapheck (born February 10, 1935) is a German painter and graphic artist whose style of painting combines features of Surrealism and Pop art. 

He was born in Düsseldorf. From 1954 to 1956 he studied painting under Bruno Goller at the Kunstakademie Düsseldorf. Klapheck's works of the mid-1950s are in a magic realist style that became more idiosyncratic when he painted the first of his typewriters. His subsequent paintings, often large in scale, are precise and seemingly realistic depictions of technical equipment, machinery and everyday objects, but strangely alienated; they are "monumental, amusingly absurd and sexually suggestive".

Klapheck's subjects through the years have included (in order of introduction) typewriters, sewing machines, water taps and showers, telephones, irons, shoes, keys, saws, car tires, bicycle bells and clocks. Influenced by Duchamp, Man Ray, and Max Ernst, Klapheck's "ironic treatment of everyday mechanics" prefigures Pop art in its magnification of the trivial. He was also close to French Surrealism and André Breton wrote his last published text about a Klapheck's exhibition at Galerie Sonnabend in 1965.
  
Between 1992 and 2002, he has painted friends, colleagues, and celebrities from the international art scene. He became a professor at the Kunstakademie Düsseldorf in 1979.

Notes

References
Grove Art Online

External links
 Konrad Klapheck on Artcyclopedia

1935 births
German artists
Living people
Academic staff of Kunstakademie Düsseldorf
Kunstakademie Düsseldorf alumni